Alexis Gilbert Stewart (born September 27, 1965) is an American television host and radio personality. She is the only child of Martha Stewart and her ex-husband Andrew. She was the co-host of Whatever with Alexis and Jennifer on Sirius Satellite Radio, and Whatever with Alexis and Jennifer on the Hallmark Channel alongside co-host Jennifer Hutt.

Personal life
Stewart was born in Manhattan. She graduated from Putney School in Putney, Vermont, in 1983. She earned a bachelor's degree in English at Barnard College at Columbia University in 1987.  Her mother, Martha Stewart, had also attended Barnard.

In 1997, Stewart married John Robert Cuti, a lawyer and former lead guitarist for The Inflatables. Cuti served as a trial lawyer during Martha Stewart's ImClone stock trading case, alongside her lead attorney Robert Morvillo. Stewart and Cuti separated before Martha Stewart was indicted in June 2003 but were not divorced until mid-2004, after the trial was over.

Stewart is a vegan.

On October 9, 2007, Stewart appeared on The Oprah Winfrey Show to discuss her struggle to conceive a child. On November 29, 2010, it was announced that Stewart had hired a gestational surrogate and was expecting her first child in early March; on March 8, 2011, her daughter, Jude, was born. Stewart explained she named her daughter after SIRIUS Satellite Radio host Rude Jude. On March 9, 2012, it was announced that Stewart had had a second child by gestational surrogacy, a son named Truman.

Career
Stewart previously co-hosted Whatever with Alexis and Jennifer on Sirius Satellite Radio and as of September 13, 2010, also on television on the Hallmark Channel. Stewart and former radio partner Jennifer Hutt talked about topics ranging from pop culture to personal relationships.  The show was billed as being about "whatever" the two women are thinking, reading, or hearing.

Stewart and Hutt's TV show, Whatever, Martha, premiered on the Fine Living Network on September 16, 2008. The second season premiered on September 23, 2009. On Whatever, Martha, Stewart and Hutt made fun of old Martha Stewart Living episodes and attempt to cook or create one of Martha Stewart's projects to see how difficult the projects are to complete. In one episode, Martha appears on the show and makes fun of herself and her guests.

The third season of Whatever with Alexis and Jennifer, which ran as Whatever, You're Wrong!, premiered on the Hallmark Channel on April 8, 2011. Whatever, Martha also premiered on the Hallmark Channel on April 8, 2011. On June 7, 2011, Stewart posted on her Whatever blog that her last day on Whatever would be that Friday, June 10.

References

External links

1965 births
Living people
American people of Polish descent
American talk radio hosts
American television hosts
Barnard College alumni
The Putney School alumni
Alexis